Robert Kiptoo Kipkorir is a Kenyan politician.

He was third Keiyo North. He served for two terms spanning for ten years in parliament; 1983–1992. He initiated several projects in the grassroots including schools owing to his background as a school head before joining politics. He joined parliament on his first attempt, and is commonly referred to by Marakwets as Hon. Kasertich the name of his father. His political slogan was
a milk gourd which in Marakwet dialect it is Setee. He ails from Embobut area Kartur village, also home to another area MP Mrs. Linah Jebii Kilimo. His time in parliament was at a time when one-party system was dominant in Kenya. KANU was the ruling party and was led by H.E Daniel Toroitich arap Moi.

References 

Year of birth missing (living people)
Living people
Kenya African National Union politicians
Members of the National Assembly (Kenya)